Crédit Agricole Group, sometimes called La banque verte due to its historical ties to farming, is a French international banking group and the world's largest cooperative financial institution. It is France's second largest bank, after BNP Paribas, as well as the third largest in Europe and tenth largest in the world. It consists of a network of Crédit Agricole local banks, the 39 Crédit Agricole regional banks, and a central institute, the Crédit Agricole S.A.. It is listed through Crédit Agricole S.A., an intermediate holding company, on Euronext Paris' first market and is part of the CAC 40 stock market index. In August 2021, it reached the top of the CAC 40. Local banks of the group owned the regional banks, in turn the regional banks majority owned the S.A. via a holding company, in turn the S.A. owned part of the subsidiaries of the group, such as LCL, the Italian network and the CIB unit. It is considered a systemically important bank by the Financial Stability Board.

It was the title sponsor of the Crédit Agricole professional road cycling team from 1998 to 2008.

History

In the second half of the 19th century, French farmers struggled to obtain long-term, flexible, reasonably-priced credit. There were several attempts to set up farming banks, including Crédit Foncier de France in 1861, but none was successful.

Birth of Crédit Agricole and creation of the local and regional banks 1894–1900 

Crédit Agricole can trace its history back to the end of the 19th century, and specifically to the Act of 1884 establishing the freedom of professional association, which authorised, among other things, the creation of farm unions and the foundation of local mutual banks. Société de Crédit Agricole was created on 23 February 1885 at Salins-les-Bains in the district of Poligny in the Jura region. It was the first of its kind in France.

Drawing on this experience and in an effort to promote lending to small family farms, the Act of 5 November 1894, which had the support of the Minister for Agriculture Jules Méline, paved the way for the creation of Crédit Agricole's local banks. The first local banks were set up by local elites, including agronomists, teachers and property owners, with farmers playing a minority role.

In the early years, business was made up exclusively of short-term loans provided as advances on harvests, enabling farmers to live more comfortably. Medium-term and long-term loans were added later, making it possible to buy equipment and livestock.

The 1894 Act did not confer any financial advantages, and the local banks soon faced financial problems, such as a lack of capital and insufficient collateral from small farmers. It was not until 1897 that the government addressed these problems by requiring the Banque de France to provide funding to Crédit Agricole through an endowment of 40 million gold francs and an annual fee of 2 million francs. A year later, the Act of 1898 resolved the collateral issues. Meanwhile, the Act of 31 March 1899 instituted a commission within the Ministry for Agriculture to distribute the government advances between the regional banks, which were also created at this time. These cooperative entities brought together the local banks in their catchment area and acted as their clearing organisations.

Building nationwide coverage 1900–1945 
More and more local and regional banks were established from the turn of the century. By the eve of the First World War, every region had at least one. But the government continued to provide three-quarters of the funding, and short-term lending still accounted for the lion's share of business despite the authorisation to issue long-term loans granted by the Acts of 29 December 1906 and 19 March 1910. With some regions becoming isolated owing to the War, the need for a central bank to regulate business became more apparent, especially as Crédit Agricole was asked to provide financing to rebuild farming operations damaged during the conflict.

New legislation of 5 August 1920 established a public central clearing organisation for the regional banks: the Office National de Crédit Agricole (ONCA), with Louis Tardy as its chief executive officer, merging two services that were previously embedded in the Ministry of Agriculture. In 1926, the institution was renamed Caisse Nationale de Crédit Agricole (CNCA).

In the 1920s, the bank continued to build its nationwide coverage and expand its business activities, notably by introducing loans to small-scale rural craftsmen in 1920, financing rural electrification and financing local authorities in rural areas from 1923.

Local and regional banks did not emerge from the 1930 crisis unscathed. The Caisse Nationale took on a greater role and aided the most heavily exposed banks. A joint deposit guarantee fund was set up in 1935. The following year, Crédit Agricole provided additional support by financing wheat stocks through discounting when the National Cereals Board (ONIC) was established. The payment mechanisms used helped to make cheques and bank accounts more popular in the countryside.

Between 1939 and 1945, the Vichy regime imposed stricter state supervision on Crédit Agricole. Major financial developments also took place at this time, including the creation of the five-year note.

Post-War period and creation of Fédération Nationale du Crédit Agricole 1945–1966 

To finance the post-war reconstruction and encourage the mechanisation of farming, CNCA stepped up deposit-taking to supplement the funds provided by the government. The regional banks opened many offices, with the total increasing from 1,000 in 1947 to 2,259 by 1967.

Fédération Nationale du Crédit Agricole (FNCA) was created in 1948. It was tasked with representing the Crédit Agricole regional banks with respect to the public authorities and CNCA. It also played a role in training staff and gradually expanding Crédit Agricole's expertise.

In 1959, Crédit Agricole was authorised by decree to finance property loans for primary residences in rural areas, irrespective of the status of the owner (even non-farmers). The distribution of long-term bonds created in 1950 enabled Crédit Agricole to be self-financing from 1963. Financial flows between the government and the organisation reversed, with Crédit Agricole now sending deposits to the Treasury.

Crédit Agricole continued to modernise, with an influx of new managerial talent both in the regional banks and at CNCA. In 1960, Paul Driant became the first Chairman of CNCA to come from a farming background. He remained in this position for 14 years.

Birth of a universal bank 1966–1988 
In 1966, as part of efforts to boost savings and remove Crédit Agricole from its budget, the government gave CNCA financial autonomy. Savings inflows no longer passed through the Treasury, and CNCA was now responsible for balancing the surpluses and deficits of the regional banks. The 1971 "Rurality Act" extended Crédit Agricole's potential financing sources to rural zones and to new types of customers, such as craftsmen and food producers. Lending to SMEs and mid-tier firms followed after.

The Banking Reform of 1966 allowed the organisation to offer households the same products as those provided by competitors, including passbook accounts and home savings plans.

The first subsidiaries were set up at the end of the 1960s to address the specific needs of CNCA: Union d'études et d'investissements (UI) was created in 1967 to make equity investments, followed by Segespar for asset management in 1968, and Unicrédit to grant loans to food producers in 1971. Crédit Agricole began distributing home purchase savings products from 1967, government-regulated mortgages from 1972 and first-time-buyer loans in 1977.

In 1976, the group adopted the slogan "le bon sens près de chez vous" ("common sense close to home").

Crédit Agricole opened its first foreign branch, in Chicago, in 1979, signalling the start of its strategy of international expansion. In that year, The Banker magazine ranked Crédit Agricole among the world's leading banks. Reflecting this progress, Crédit Agricole was made subject to France's 1984 Banking Act; previously it had been subject only to the Rural Code. In addition, an interbank agreement was signed to make Crédit Agricole bank cards part of the carte bleue system used by other banks.

The group's business diversification started in the 1980s. The Predica life insurance subsidiary was set up in 1986, while property & casualty unit Pacifica was created in 1990. The group expanded into bancassurance, offering the first retirement savings plans. At this time, many local bank directors were also directors of Groupama, an insurer from the farming sector. There was talk of a merger between the two, but this did not ultimately come to pass.

Institutional changes 1988–2001 

On 18 January 1988, the CNCA Mutualisation Act came into force. CNCA was reincorporated into a public limited company, with a 90% stake sold to the regional banks and 10% to staff. Crédit Agricole became fully independent of the government, putting an end to the latter's practice of skimming off surplus funds. In 1990, Crédit Agricole lost the monopoly on granting low-interest loans to farmers and one year later, in 1991, the "normalisation" process was completed as it was allowed to begin financing large corporations.

International expansion continued with the acquisition of stakes in Banco Ambrosiano Veneto in Italy in 1989 and Banco Espírito Santo in Portugal in 1991.

Consolidation among the regional banks began officially in 1990, with the aim of reducing costs. The aim was to halve the number of regional banks, and that objective had been surpassed by the turn of the 21st century. Meanwhile, 18 of the 94 regional banks were listed on the secondary market through issues of cooperative investment certificates, although most of the share capital of the regional banks remained in the hands of the 5.5 million client stakeholders.

In 1993, Lucien Douroux, who led the plan to mutualise FNCA, became CNCA's first Chief Executive Officer, having been appointed by Crédit Agricole from existing staff.

In 1996, the group bought Banque Indosuez and then created Indocam, an asset management subsidiary (renamed Crédit Agricole Asset Management in 1999), and Crédit Agricole Indosuez for corporate and investment banking. In 1999, diversification continued as the group took a stake in the newly privatised Crédit Lyonnais, and acquired leading consumer finance company Sofinco.

CNCA was listed on the stock market in 2001 under the name Crédit Agricole S.A. This gave the regional banks a listed vehicle through which to carry out major acquisitions.

Crédit Agricole in the 21st century

Picking up the pace of business diversification 2001–2008 

The 21st century saw the group continue to diversify its business line-up. Finaref was acquired in 2003. That same year, Crédit Agricole acquired Crédit Lyonnais in a friendly takeover orchestrated by then Chairman of the Board René Carron after a market battle was triggered by the government's decision to auction off its stake in Crédit Lyonnais in December 2002. The two banks were combined in 2003 and 2004, which led to the different business lines being grouped into subsidiaries. This included the creation of Calyon in 2004 from the merger of the corporate and investment banking activities of Crédit Lyonnais and Crédit Agricole Indosuez. Crédit Lyonnais focused on retail banking and was rebranded as LCL in August 2005.

Between 2004 and 2005, the regional banks and Crédit Agricole S.A. embarked on a major development plan aimed at bolstering the regional banks' leading positions in France by gaining a greater presence in major cities, while at the same time increasing the group's international reach. Businesses were established in Egypt, Ukraine, Serbia, Greece, Italy and Portugal.
In 2006, Crédit Agricole Assurances was created to bring together the Pacifica and Predica brands.

In 2007, the group started to part away from newly formed Italian banking giant Intesa Sanpaolo, which Crédit Agricole was the largest shareholder of Banca Intesa, despite on 22 January 2007 Crédit Agricole still acted as the third largest shareholder of Intesa Sanpaolo. On 1 March 2007 Crédit Agricole acquired 202 former Banca Intesa branches, as well as Cariparma and FriulAdria from Intesa Sanpaolo. In 2011 Crédit Agricole acquired Carispezia from Intesa Sanpaolo, as well as 96 branches directly from Intesa Sanpaolo. In 2012 Crédit Agricole finally sold all the shares of Intesa Sanpaolo.

Business overview 
The group's acquisitions enabled it to strengthen its leadership in French retail banking, expand its position in corporate and investment banking and build up its international network of branches and subsidiaries. By now, the group was the number-one bank in France with 28% of the domestic market, the global number-two by revenues and number-ten by profits, according to Fortune magazine, and number-15 worldwide according to Forbes rankings.

Crédit Agricole and the 2008–2012 crisis 
When the interbank lending market seized up, Crédit Agricole was forced in January 2008 to sell its long-standing stake in Suez for €1,3 billion and then in May 2008 to organise a €5.9 billion rights issue to which all the regional banks subscribed to meet Basel II regulatory requirements. It also undertook a €5 billion programme of non-strategic asset disposals.

At the end of 2008, the government decided to loan France's six largest banks €21 billion in two tranches, at an interest rate of 8%, to enable them to continue to play their role in the economy. Crédit Agricole did not take part in the second tranche and repaid the government in October 2009. Crédit Agricole's crisis exit strategy was well received by the markets, with the share price gaining more than 40% over 2009.

In 2012, Crédit Agricole continued to report negative results, posting a loss of around €3 billion in the third quarter. The Greek branch Emporiki was separated from its profitable wealthy parts in Albania, Bulgaria and Romania which were integrated into the Crédit Agricole group. The whole investment into Emporiki cost around €9 billion. The remaining Greek part was sold off to Alpha Bank for €1. Crédit Agricole also withdrew totally from Spanish bank Bankinter, resulting in a book loss of €193 million, and took a massive €600 million write-down on consumer credit, notably owing to difficulties in Italy. Furthermore, Crédit Agricole had to write down the goodwill on its balance sheet. Goodwill amounted to €17.7 billion in September 2012, well above the actual value. In early February 2013, the bank announced that it would book €3.8 billion in writedowns and costs – a record amount according to the media.

Mergers and acquisitions from 2014 
In March 2014, the Crédit Agricole Group unveiled its medium-term strategic plan, which put the emphasis on retail banking, insurance and saving. Internationally, the group decided to refocus on its core markets, starting with Italy, the group's second-largest market.

The Crédit Agricole Group sold its Bulgarian subsidiary to Corporate Commercial Bank for €160 million. On 22 April 2014, Crédit Agricole S.A., Crédit Agricole Nord and Crédit Agricole Nord-Est announced that they would sell 50% of their stake in Crelan S.A., a Belgian bank created out of the merger of Crédit Agricole Belgique and Centea, to Caisses coopératives belges by June 2015.

In 2017, the group bought 3 small Italian banks.

Corporate governance 
Crédit Agricole has a three-tier structure, comprising the local banks, the regional banks (and their branches and equity investments) and Crédit Agricole S.A. (and its subsidiaries). The local and regional banks are cooperative companies. Crédit Agricole S.A. is a société anonyme. Crédit Agricole is one of the leading cooperative companies in the world.

Local banks 
The 2,509 local banks form the foundation of Crédit Agricole. They have 7.4 million stakeholders (December 2013), who are both clients and owners of the share capital (through ownership shares) of the local banks, in accordance with the cooperative governance principle.

The local banks hold the bulk of the capital of the regional banks. At the annual general meetings of the local banks, which attract around 500,000 participants every year, the stakeholders appoint over 32,000 volunteer directors.

Regional banks 
Crédit Agricole's regional banks are cooperative entities and fully-fledged banks, offering a wide range of financial products and services to their 20 million clients (end-2008). They boast a network of some 7,200 branches and 12,000 ATMs, plus more than 7,000 in-store cash points, which provide Crédit Agricole customers with basic banking services. Some regional banks have merged to improve their financial strength and competitiveness, with the total number of regional banks falling from 94 to 39 between 1988 and 2008.

Preventing exclusion from banking services
To prevent customers affected by a personal event, such as a death or unemployment, from being excluded from banking services, 30 regional banks have set up Point Passerelle centres, which provide a friendly ear, mediation and support for clients looking for help to get out of a difficult situation. Caisse Régionale du Nord-Est first introduced the system in 1997.

Promoting employment for people with disabilities
Through an association set up to promote the employment of people with disabilities within Crédit Agricole (HECA), the Crédit Agricole regional banks devote resources to the recruitment, integration and continued employment of disabled workers. Measures include workstation modifications, transport facilities and training. Since a lack of training makes it harder for people with disabilities to get work, Crédit Agricole has set up work/study training programmes to enable people who have their high school diploma to receive post-secondary qualifications. The goal was to recruit more than 800 disabled persons between 2006 and end-2010, and by end-2009, more than 360 permanent contracts and 670 work/study contracts had been signed. Former Miss France runner-up Sophie Vouzelaud, who has been deaf from birth, is HECA's official ambassador.

Promoting the cooperative model
The regional banks help to promote the cooperative model locally through a variety of initiatives, such as the Perspectives Mutualistes conference series (Pau in 2006, Angers in 2007, Reims in 200831, Orléans in 2009), and by issuing special bank cards for stakeholders.

Fédération Nationale du Crédit Agricole 

Fédération Nationale du Crédit Agricole (FNCA) is the body through which the regional banks discuss policy, express their views and represent themselves. FNCA plays the role of a trade body. It is a forum for discussions that arise at the grass-roots level, and it plays a proactive, guiding role.

It represents Crédit Agricole's regional banks and the group with respect to the public authorities, agricultural trade associations and bodies with authority for cooperative and mutual banking.
FNCA provides services to regional banks, particularly in the fields of vocational training, through the Crédit Agricole Mutuel training centre, and human resource management.
The senior management team is represented by:
 Dominique Lefebvre, Chairman of Fédération Nationale du Crédit Agricole,
 Philippe Brassac, Secretary General of Fédération Nationale du Crédit Agricole,
 Bertrand Corbeau, CEO of Fédération Nationale du Crédit Agricole.

Crédit Agricole S.A. 
In 1988, Caisse Nationale de Crédit Agricole was privatised, becoming Crédit Agricole S.A., a public limited company owned by the regional banks and group employees. In 2001, Crédit Agricole S.A. was floated on the stock market, although the regional banks (44 at the time) retained a majority share, as provided for by the group's mutual articles of association.

Senior management of Crédit Agricole S.A.
 Chairman: Dominique Lefebvre
 CEO: Philippe Brassac

Board of directors
The Board is made up of members elected by the annual general meeting, representatives of trade organisations, members elected by employees, a non-voting member and a representative of the Works Council.

A complex structure
The regional banks own 54% of Crédit Agricole S.A., which in turn holds 25% of their capital in the form of non-voting cooperative securities (certificats coopératifs d'associés). An internal debate is continually underway on striking a balance between growing activities that serve the regional banks directly and promoting businesses that lie outside their sphere. Institutional investors, particularly in the UK and US, are not always at ease with this approach.

Brand identity

Slogan 
 1976 to 1987: "Le bon sens près de chez vous" ("Common sense close to home");
 1987 to 1994: "Le bon sens en action" ("Common sense in action");
 1994 to 2005: "L'imagination dans le bon sens" ("Imagination guided by common sense" but also "Imagination in the right direction");
 2005 to 2011: "Une relation durable, ça change la vie" ("A lasting relationship changes your life");
 Since 2011: "Le bon sens a de l'avenir" ("Common sense has a future").

Visual identity

Financial and market data 
The cooperative investment certificates of 15 regional banks, and the shares of Crédit Agricole S.A., the group holding company, are listed on the Paris stock exchange. Crédit Agricole S.A. is also a member of the Dow Jones, Euro Stoxx 50, SBF 120, Euronext 100, ASPI Eurozone and FTSE4Good Index.

Crédit Agricole Group data 
The Crédit Agricole Group comprises all the local and regional banks, Crédit Agricole S.A. and all their subsidiaries.

Crédit Agricole S.A. Group data 
The Crédit Agricole S.A. Group comprises the holding company, Crédit Agricole S.A., as well as all its subsidiaries.

Sports sponsorship

Cycling 
In 1998, following the Tour de France, Crédit Agricole became the lead sponsor of the cycling team led by Roger Legeay, previously sponsored by Gan, an insurer. The initial investment was FRF 30 million a year. Over the years, the team won many stages in major cycling races as well as several national championships. In 2008, Crédit Agricole reviewed its sports sponsorship strategy and ended its partnership after ten years.

Rugby 
Crédit Agricole has been the main sponsor of the Italian national rugby team since 2007 via its Italian subsidiary Cariparma.

Football 
It was the official sponsor of France national football team in the 2018 FIFA World Cup.

Controversies 

 In September 2007 Credit Agricole had to book a €250 million charge related to an unauthorized trading loss at its New York subsidiary.
 On April 18, 2008, Credit Agricole revealed that it would post $1.2 billion in losses related to subprime mortgage securities. In May 2008 Credit Agricole sought to raise €5.9 billion in equity capital from its shareholders. The shares controversially sold off from €19 to €6 over the successive period as the financial crisis escalated.
 In May 2008 Credit Agricole identified €5billion of asset disposals including the bank's 5.6 percent stake in Italian bank Intesa Sanpaolo, which was worth an estimated €3 billion.
 The group purchased in August 2006 Emporiki Bank for €2.2 billion which it later sold for one euro after suffering €6 billion of losses in the investment.
 In 2010 the French government's Autorité de la concurrence (the department in charge of regulating competition) fined eleven banks, including Crédit Agricole, the sum of €384.9 million for colluding to charge unjustified fees on check processing, especially for extra fees charged during the transition from paper check transfer to "Exchanges Check-Image" electronic transfer.

See also

 European Financial Services Roundtable

References

Further reading
 Gale Directory of Company Histories, "Credit Agricole" (2012)  online

External links

Crédit Agricole
Banks established in 1894
Investment management companies of France
Multinational companies headquartered in France
French brands
Companies listed on Euronext Paris
CAC 40
Systemically important financial institutions
Banks under direct supervision of the European Central Bank